Verlot is a census-designated place (CDP) in Snohomish County, Washington, United States. The population was 285 at the 2010 census.

Geography
Verlot is located at  (48.085938, -121.762863).

According to the United States Census Bureau, the CDP has a total area of 6.5 square miles (16.8 km2), of which, 6.4 square miles (16.5 km2) of it is land and 0.1 square miles (0.4 km2) of it (2.15%) is water.

Demographics
As of the census of 2000, there were 170 people, 66 households, and 41 families living in the CDP. The population density was 26.7 people per square mile (10.3/km2). There were 96 housing units at an average density of 15.1/sq mi (5.8/km2). The racial makeup of the CDP was 98.24% White, 0.59% Native American, 0.59% Asian, and 0.59% from two or more races. Hispanic or Latino of any race were 1.18% of the population.

There were 66 households, out of which 34.8% had children under the age of 18 living with them, 48.5% were married couples living together, 12.1% had a female householder with no husband present, and 36.4% were non-families. 21.2% of all households were made up of individuals, and 3.0% had someone living alone who was 65 years of age or older. The average household size was 2.58 and the average family size was 3.10.

In the CDP, the age distribution of the population shows 29.4% under the age of 18, 7.1% from 18 to 24, 30.0% from 25 to 44, 26.5% from 45 to 64, and 7.1% who were 65 years of age or older. The median age was 39 years. For every 100 females, there were 100.0 males. For every 100 females age 18 and over, there were 114.3 males.

The median income for a household in the CDP was $29,519, and the median income for a family was $27,692. Males had a median income of $90,957 versus $46,250 for females. The per capita income for the CDP was $13,205. About 20.7% of families and 33.5% of the population were below the poverty line, including 47.1% of those under the age of 18 and 30.0% of those 65 or over.

References

Census-designated places in Washington (state)
Census-designated places in Snohomish County, Washington